The Belize Audubon Society is a conservation group in Belize, formed in 1969. Like similar societies elsewhere, it is named in honor of ornithologist and naturalist John James Audubon.

History 
The Belize Audubon Society was formed in 1969 by Dora Weyer and a group of conservationists. The Society was formed with a vision to inspire people to live in harmony with and benefit from the environment. The first president of the Belize Audubon Society, James A. Waight, served from 1969 until 1986.  He was born in Belize City and was the Surveyor General of Belize. His dedication to the Belize Audubon Society is honored by an annual award for services to conservation in Belize called the James A. Waight Award.  The Belize Audubon Society aims at conserving and protecting wildlife in Belize for the benefit of humanity and the earth's biological diversity. In 1973 the society's  first launched  conservation project, the Jabiru Stork, was added to Belize's list of protected species.

Board of directors
The responsibilities of the Board of Directors of the Belize Audubon Society include policy setting, fiscal guidance, and governance of the society. The Board is composed of 15 voluntary members.  These members are elected from general membership during the Annual General Meeting, which is held no later than May 31 of each year.

The following officers make up the board:
 President
 1st Vice President
 2nd Vice President
 1st Secretary
 2nd Secretary
 8 Directors.

Laws Governing BAS 
The laws of Belize that govern the operation of the Belize Audubon Society and the conservation efforts of this society are as follows:
 Wildlife Protection Act (Chp.220)
 National Parks System Act (Chp.215)
 Forest Act (Chp.213)
 Fisheries Act (Chp.210)
 Ancient Monuments and Antiquities Act (Chp.330 Rev.2000)

Protected Areas 
The Belize Audubon Society co-manages seven protected areas located in Belize. These protected areas are:

 Blue Hole Natural Monument
 Cockscomb Basin Wildlife Sanctuary
 Crooked Tree Wildlife Sanctuary
 Guanacaste National Park
 Half Moon Caye Natural Monument
 St. Herman's Blue Hole National Park
 Victoria Peak Natural Monument

James A. Waight Award 
The James A. Waight award is presented on February 16 each year to individuals or organizations in recognition for their work in the protection and enhancement of Belize's natural environment. The award is named after the Belize Audubon Society's first president.

Selection Criteria 

Nominees of the award must meet the following criteria:
 Must be a Belizean or currently reside in Belize.
 Members of the Belize Audubon Society are preferred. Otherwise nominee must be involved in work directly related to the environment.
 Nominee must be involved in rainforest protection, coastal zone protection, pollution control, waste management, eco tourism promotion and the socioeconomic environment, indigenous rights, and socio-cultural protection. 
 The efforts of the nominees must be national in scope, have a human dimension, and be innovative or non-traditional.

See also
 Conservation in Belize
 National Audubon Society (U.S.)

References

External links
Official website

Audubon movement
Nature conservation in Belize
Non-profit organisations based in Belize